Joe Powell (born 11 April 1994) is an Australian rugby union player who currently plays as a scrum-half for the  in the English Premiership. He is also a member of the  extended playing squad, making his first appearances for the franchise during the 2015 Super Rugby season.

Powell was a member of the Australian schoolboys shadow squad in 2012 and was part of the Australia under-20 side which competed in the 2014 IRB Junior World Championship in New Zealand. In 2016, he was selected in the 39-man Australian squad for the Test series against England.

Powell was the starting scrumhalf in the Brumbies 28-23 grand final victory over the Queensland Reds to claim the 2020 Super Rugby AU title.

Powell has signed for the Melbourne Rebels on a two-year deal from the 2021 season.

Powell is of Irish descent and holds dual Australian and Irish citizenship.

Super Rugby statistics

References

1994 births
Living people
Australian rugby union players
Australian people of Irish descent
Australia international rugby union players
Rugby union scrum-halves
Canberra Vikings players
ACT Brumbies players
Melbourne Rebels players
Rugby union players from Canberra
London Irish players
Australian expatriate rugby union players
Expatriate rugby union players in England